LeRoy–Gridley USD 245, also known as Southern Coffey County, is a public unified school district headquartered in LeRoy, Kansas, United States,  serving the southern part of Coffey County.  The district includes the communities of LeRoy, Gridley, and nearby rural areas.  Enrollment for the 2012–13 school year was 216.

Administration
The district is currently under the administration of superintendent Russell Mildward.

Schools
The school district operates the following schools:
 Southern Coffey County High School
 Southern Coffey County Junior High School
 Gridley Elementary School
 LeRoy Elementary School

See also
 Kansas State Department of Education
 Kansas State High School Activities Association
 List of high schools in Kansas
 List of unified school districts in Kansas

References

External links
 

School districts in Kansas
Education in Osage County, Kansas